Cupressus sargentii is a species of conifer in the family Cupressaceae known by the common name Sargent's cypress. It is endemic to California, where it is known from Mendocino County southwards to Santa Barbara County.  This taxon is limited to  the Coast Range mountains. It grows in forests with other conifers, as well as chaparral and other local mountain habitat, usually in pure stands on serpentine soils. It generally grows 10 to 15 meters (33–50 feet) tall, but it is known to exceed 22 meters (73 feet). On Carson Ridge in Marin County, as well as Hood Mountain in Sonoma County, the species comprises a pygmy forest of trees which do not attain heights greater than 240–360 cm (8–12 feet) due to high mineral concentrations in the serpentine soil. 

One notable population occurs in the Cedar Mountain Ridge area of Eastern Alameda County. According to Carl Wolf, who extensively studied the New World Cypress in the 1930s and 1940s, seed from the Cedar Mountain stand of Cupressus sargentii produced the most vigorous seedlings.

Like many of the New World Cupressaceae, Sargent Cypress usually reproduces with the aid of wildfire, which cause an opening of the cones and exposure of bare mineral soil for seedling germination, though occasionally seeds will fall and germinate without fire, though such seems to be the exception rather than the rule. It is often the case that many trees in a particular stand will all be the same age, so that a sort of stratification occurs of different colonies all of the same age. Sargent Cypress can begin producing cones as early as five or six years of age.

References

Further reading
Forest Service Fire Ecology
Wolf, C. B. & Wagener, W. E. (1948). The New World cypresses. El Aliso 1: 195–205.

External links

Jepson Manual Treatment of Cupressus sargentii
USDA Plants Profile for Cupressus sargentii
Flora of North America
UC CalPhotos gallery

sargentii
Endemic flora of California
Natural history of the California chaparral and woodlands
Natural history of the California Coast Ranges
Trees of the Southwestern United States
~
Plants described in 1909
Taxonomy articles created by Polbot